The Cayman Democratic Party, formerly known as the United Democratic Party, was a political party in the Cayman Islands formed in late 2001 and collapsed in February 2021.

History
In the elections of 8 November 2000, with a turnout of 80%, only non-partisans were elected. After the election members of parliament formed the United Democratic Party, currently headed by McKeeva Bush.

The Cayman Democratic Party served as the opposition party in the Legislative Assembly of the Cayman Islands from 2013 to 2017. The party also previously served as opposition from May 2005-May 2009.

After the 2017 election, a coalition government between the Progressives, Democratic Party, and independents was announced where Alden McLaughlin of the Progressives would have remained as premier and Democratic leader Bush would have become speaker. However, a coalition agreement was later reached between the Democratic Party and all independent members apart from one to form a Bush-led “government of national unity;” this Democratic Party-Independent deal later fell through and the initial Progressive-Democratic-Independent deal was re-agreed to.

Collapse
Before the 2021 election, in December 2020, Democratic leader McKeeva Bush received a two-month suspended jail sentence for assaulting a woman in February 2020 leading to a no-confidence motion against him. Premier McLaughlin asked Governor Martyn Roper to dissolve Parliament on 14 February, triggering early elections instead of having the vote on the motion. In the lead-up to the election, the Democratic Party was described as "[appearing] to be defunct" as figures previously of the party (including Bush) instead contested as independents.

List of Cayman Democratic Party leaders 
 McKeeva Bush: (November 2001 – February 2021)

Electoral performance

See also 
:Category:Cayman Democratic Party politicians

References

Political parties in the Cayman Islands
Year of establishment missing
Conservative parties in British Overseas Territories